The qualifying competition for the 1988 CONCACAF Pre-Olympic Tournament determined the three teams for the final tournament.

First round

The winners from Group A would qualify for the Second Round. The Group B, and Group C winners would qualify for the Final Round automatically.

Group A

Notes
Surinam were originally drawn against Trinidad and Tobago but withdrew from the competition. Trinidad and Tobago received a bye to the Second Round

Group B

Group C

Second round

References

CONCACAF Men's Olympic Qualifying Tournament